Finns or Finnish people are a Baltic Finnic ethnic group native to Finland.

Finns are traditionally divided into smaller regional groups that span several countries adjacent to Finland, both those who are native to these countries as well as those who have resettled. Some of these may be classified as separate ethnic groups, rather than subgroups of Finns. These include the Kvens and Forest Finns in Norway, the Tornedalians in Sweden, and the Ingrian Finns in Russia.

Finnish, the language spoken by Finns, is closely related to other Balto-Finnic languages, e.g. Estonian and Karelian. The Finnic languages are a subgroup of the larger Uralic family of languages, which also includes Hungarian. These languages are markedly different from most other languages spoken in Europe, which belong to the Indo-European family of languages. Native Finns can also be divided according to dialect into subgroups sometimes called heimo (lit. tribe), although such divisions have become less important due to internal migration.

Today, there are approximately 6–7 million ethnic Finns and their descendants worldwide, with the majority of them living in their native Finland and the surrounding countries, namely Sweden, Russia and Norway. An overseas Finnish diaspora has long been established in the countries of the Americas and Oceania, with the population of primarily immigrant background, namely Australia, Canada, New Zealand, Brazil, and the United States.

Subgroups
The Population Register Centre maintains information on the birthplace, citizenship and mother tongue of the people living in Finland, but does not specifically categorize any as Finns by ethnicity.

Balto-Finnic peoples

The majority of people living in Finland consider Finnish to be their first language. According to Statistics Finland, of the country's total population of 5,503,297 at the end of 2016, 88.3% (or 4,857,795) considered Finnish to be their native language. It is not known how many of the ethnic Finns living outside Finland speak Finnish as their first language.

In addition to the Finnish-speaking inhabitants of Finland, the Kvens (people of Finnish descent in Norway), the Tornedalians (people of Finnish descent in northernmost Sweden), and the Karelians in the historic Finnish province of Karelia and Evangelical Lutheran Ingrian Finns (both in the northwestern Russian Federation), as well as Finnish expatriates in various countries, are Baltic Finns.

Finns have been traditionally divided into sub-groups (heimot in Finnish) along regional, dialectical or ethnographical lines. These subgroups include the people of Finland Proper (varsinaissuomalaiset), Satakunta (satakuntalaiset), Tavastia (hämäläiset), Savonia (savolaiset), Karelia (karjalaiset) and Ostrobothnia (pohjalaiset). These sub-groups express regional self-identity with varying frequency and significance.

There are a number of distinct dialects (murre s. murteet pl. in Finnish) of the Finnish language spoken in Finland, although the exclusive use of the standard Finnish (yleiskieli)—both in its formal written (kirjakieli) and more casual spoken (puhekieli) form—in Finnish schools, in the media, and in popular culture, along with internal migration and urbanization, have considerably diminished the use of regional varieties, especially since the middle of the 20th century. Historically, there were three dialects: the South-Western (Lounaismurteet), Tavastian (Hämeen murre), and Karelian (Karjalan murre). These and neighboring languages mixed with each other in various ways as the population spread out, and evolved into the Southern Ostrobothnian (Etelä-Pohjanmaan murre), Central Ostrobothnian (Keski-Pohjanmaan murre), Northern Ostrobothnian (Pohjois-Pohjanmaan murre), Far-Northern (Peräpohjolan murre), Savonian (Savon murre), and South-Eastern (Kaakkois-Suomen murteet) aka South Karelian (Karjalan murre) dialects.

Sweden Finns 

The Sweden Finns are either native to Sweden or have emigrated from Finland to Sweden. An estimated 450,000 first- or second-generation immigrants from Finland live in Sweden, of which approximately half speak Finnish. The majority moved from Finland to Sweden following the Second World War, contributing and taking advantage of the rapidly expanding Swedish economy. This emigration peaked in 1970 and has been declining since. There is also a native Finnish-speaking minority in Sweden, the Tornedalians in the border area in the extreme north of Sweden. The Finnish language has official status as one of five minority languages in Sweden, but only in the five northernmost municipalities in Sweden.

Other groups 
The term Finns is also used for other Baltic Finns, including Izhorians in Ingria, Karelians in Karelia and Veps in the former Veps National Volost, all in Russia. Among these groups, the Karelians is the most populous one, followed by the Ingrians. According to a 2002 census, it was found that Ingrians also identify with Finnish ethnic identity, referring to themselves as Ingrian Finns.

Terminology 

The Finnish term for Finns is suomalaiset (sing. suomalainen).

It is a matter of debate how best to designate the Finnish-speakers of Sweden, all of whom have migrated to Sweden from Finland. Terms used include Sweden Finns and Finnish Swedes, with a distinction almost always made between more recent Finnish immigrants, most of whom have arrived after World War II, and Tornedalians, who have lived along what is now the Swedish-Finnish border since the 15th century. The term "Finn" occasionally also has the meaning "a member of a people speaking Finnish or a Finnic language".

Etymology 

Historical references to Northern Europe are scarce, and the names given to its peoples and geographic regions are obscure; therefore, the etymologies of the names are questionable. Such names as Fenni, Phinnoi, Finnum, and Skrithfinni / Scridefinnum appear in a few written texts starting from about two millennia ago in association with peoples located in a northern part of Europe, but the real meaning of these terms is debatable. It has been suggested that this non-Uralic ethnonym is of Germanic language origin and related to such words as finthan (Old High German) 'find', 'notice';  (Old High German) 'check', 'try'; and fendo (Old High German) and vende (Old Middle German) 'pedestrian', 'wanderer'. Another etymological interpretation associates this ethnonym with fen in a more toponymical approach. Yet another theory postulates that the words Finn and Kven are cognates. The Icelandic Eddas and Norse sagas (11th to 14th centuries), some of the oldest written sources probably originating from the closest proximity, use words like finnr and finnas inconsistently. However, most of the time they seem to mean northern dwellers with a mobile life style. Current linguistic research supports the hypothesis of an etymological link between the Finnish and the Sami languages and other modern Uralic languages. It also supports the hypothesis of a common etymological origin of the toponyms Sápmi (Sami for Lapland) and Suomi (Finnish for Finland) and the Finnish and Sami names for the Finnish and Sami languages (suomi and saame). Current research has disproved older hypotheses about connections with the names Häme (Finnish for Tavastia) and the proto-Baltic word *žeme / Slavic земля (zemlja) meaning 'land'. This research also supports the earlier hypothesis that the designation Suomi started out as the designation for Southwestern Finland (Finland Proper, Varsinais-Suomi) and later for their language and later for the whole area of modern Finland. But it is not known how, why, and when this occurred. Petri Kallio had suggested that the name Suomi may bear even earlier Indo-European echoes with the original meaning of either "land" or "human", but he has since disproved his hypothesis.

The first known mention of Finns is in the Old English poem Widsith which was compiled in the 10th century, though its contents are  believed to be older. Among the first written sources possibly designating western Finland as the land of Finns are also two rune stones. One of these is in Söderby, Sweden, with the inscription finlont (U 582), and the other is in Gotland, a Swedish island in the Baltic Sea, with the inscription finlandi (G 319 M) dating from the 11th century.

History

Origins 
Like other Western Uralic and Baltic Finnic peoples, Finns originate between the Volga, Oka and Kama rivers in what is now Russia. The genetic basis of future Finns also emerged in this area. There have been at least two noticeable waves of migration to the west by the ancestors of Finns. They began to move upstream of the Dnieper and from there to the upper reaches of the Väinäjoki (Daugava), from where they eventually moved along the river towards the Baltic Sea in 1250–1000 years BC. The second wave of migration brought the main group of ancestors of Finns from the Baltic Sea to the southwest coast of Finland in the 8th century BC.

During the 80–100 generations of the migration, Finnish language changed its form, although it retained its Finno-Ugric roots. Material culture also changed during the transition, although the Baltic Finnic culture that formed on the shores of the Baltic Sea constantly retained its roots in a way that distinguished it from its neighbors.

Finnish material culture became independent of the wider Baltic Finnic culture in the 6th and 7th centuries, and by the turn of the 8th century the culture of metal objects that had prevailed in Finland had developed in its own way. The same era can be considered to be broadly the date of the birth of the independent Finnish language, although its prehistory, like other Baltic Finnic languages, extends far into the past.

Language 

Just as uncertain are the possible mediators and the timelines for the development of the Uralic majority language of the Finns. On the basis of comparative linguistics, it has been suggested that the separation of the Finnic and the Sami languages took place during the 2nd millennium BC, and that the Proto-Uralic roots of the entire language group date from about the 6th to the 8th millennium BC. When the Uralic languages were first spoken in the area of contemporary Finland is debated. It is thought that Proto-Finnic (the proto-language of the Finnic languages) was not spoken in modern Finland, because the maximum divergence of the daughter languages occurs in modern-day Estonia. Therefore, Finnish was already a separate language when arriving in Finland. Furthermore, the traditional Finnish lexicon has a large number of words (about one-third) without a known etymology, hinting at the existence of a disappeared Paleo-European language; these include toponyms such as niemi "peninsula". Because the Finnish language itself reached a written form only in the 16th century, little primary data remains of early Finnish life. For example, the origins of such cultural icons as the sauna, and the kantele (an instrument of the zither family) have remained rather obscure.

Livelihood 

Agriculture supplemented by fishing and hunting has been the traditional livelihood among Finns. Slash-and-burn agriculture was practiced in the forest-covered east by Eastern Finns up to the 19th century. Agriculture, along with the language, distinguishes Finns from the Sami, who retained the hunter-gatherer lifestyle longer and moved to coastal fishing and reindeer herding. Following industrialization and modernization of Finland, most Finns were urbanized and employed in modern service and manufacturing occupations, with agriculture becoming a minor employer (see Economy of Finland).

Religion 

Christianity spread to Finland from the Medieval times onward and original native traditions of Finnish paganism have become extinct. Finnish paganism combined various layers of Finnic, Norse, Germanic and Baltic paganism. Finnic Jumala was some sort of sky-god and is shared with Estonia. Belief of a thunder-god, Ukko or Perkele, may have Baltic origins. Elements had their own protectors, such as Ahti for waterways and Tapio for forests. Local animistic deities, "haltia", which resemble Scandinavian tomte, were also given offerings to, and bear worship was also known. Finnish neopaganism or "suomenusko" attempts to revive these traditions.

Christianity was introduced to Finns and Karelians from the east, in the form of Eastern Orthodoxy from the Medieval times onwards. However, Swedish kings conquered western parts of Finland in the late 13th century, imposing Roman Catholicism. Reformation in Sweden had the important effect that bishop Mikael Agricola, a student of Martin Luther's, introduced written Finnish, and literacy became common during the 18th century. When Finland became independent, it was overwhelmingly Lutheran Protestant. A small number of Eastern Orthodox Finns were also included, thus the Finnish government recognized both religions as "national religions". In 2017 70.9% of the population of Finland belonged to the Evangelical Lutheran Church of Finland, 1.1% to the Finnish Orthodox Church, 1.6% to other religious groups and 26.3% had no religious affiliation. Whereas, in Russian Ingria, there were both Lutheran and Orthodox Finns; the former were identified as Ingrian Finns while the latter were considered Izhorians or Karelians.

Subdivisions

Finns are traditionally assumed to originate from two different populations speaking different dialects of Proto-Finnic (kantasuomi). Thus, a division into Western Finnish and Eastern Finnish is made. Further, there are subgroups, traditionally called heimo, according to dialects and local culture. Although ostensibly based on late Iron Age settlement patterns, the  have been constructed according to dialect during the rise of nationalism in the 19th century.

 Western
 Southwest Finland and Satakunta: Finns proper (varsinaissuomalaiset)
 Tavastia: Tavastians (hämäläiset)
 Ostrobothnia: Ostrobothnians (pohjalaiset)
Southern Ostrobothnians (eteläpohjalaiset)
Central Ostrobothnians (keskipohjalaiset)
Northern Ostrobothnians (pohjoispohjalaiset)
 Lapland: Lapland Finns (lappilaiset)
 Eastern
 Karelia: Finnish Karelians (karjalaiset); Karelian dialects of Finnish are distinct from the Karelian language spoken in Russia, and most of North Karelia actually speak Savonian dialects
 Savonia: Savonians (savolaiset)
 Kainuu: Kainuu Finns (kainuulaiset)
 Finnish minority groups outside Finland
 Tornedalians (länsipohjalaiset) of Norrbotten, Sweden
 Forest Finns (metsäsuomalaiset) of Sweden and Norway
 Kvens (kveenit) of Finnmark, Norway
 Ingrian Finns (inkerinsuomalaiset) of Ingria, Russia
 Finnish diaspora (ulkosuomalaiset)
 Sweden Finns (ruotsinsuomalaiset), Finnish minority in Sweden

The historical provinces of Finland can be seen to approximate some of these divisions. The regions of Finland, another remnant of a past governing system, can be seen to reflect a further manifestation of a local identity.

Journalist  toured Finland in 1984 and looked into people's traditional and contemporary understanding of the heimos, listing them as follows: Tavastians (hämäläiset), Ostrobothnians (pohjalaiset), Lapland Finns (lappilaiset), Finns proper (varsinaissuomalaiset), Savonians (savolaiset), Kainuu Finns (kainuulaiset), and Finnish Karelians (karjalaiset).

Today the importance of the tribal (heimo) identity generally depends on the region. It is strongest among the Karelians, Savonians and South Ostrobothnians.

Genetics

The use of mitochondrial "mtDNA" (female lineage) and Y-chromosomal "Y-DNA" (male lineage) DNA-markers in tracing back the history of human populations has been gaining ground in ethnographic studies of Finnish people (e.g. the National Geographic Genographic Project and the Suomi DNA-projekti.) Haplogroup U5 is estimated to be the oldest major mtDNA haplogroup in Europe and is found in the whole of Europe at a low frequency, but seems to be found in significantly higher levels among Finns, Estonians and the Sami people. 
The older population of European hunter-gatherers that lived across large parts of Europe before the early farmers appeared are outside the genetic variation of modern populations, but most similar to Finns.

With regard to the Y-chromosome, the most common haplogroups of the Finns are N1c (58%), I1a (28%), R1a (5%), and R1b (3.5%). N1c, which is found mainly in a few countries in Europe (Estonia, Finland, Latvia, Lithuania, and Russia), is a subgroup of the haplogroup N distributed across northern Eurasia and suggested to have entered Europe from Siberia.

Variation within Finns is, according to fixation index (FST) values, greater than anywhere else in Europe. Greatest intra-Finnish FST distance is found about 60, greatest intra-Swedish FST distance about 25. FST distances between for example Germans, French and Hungarians is only 10, and between Estonians, Russians and Poles it is also 10. Thus Finns from different parts of the country are more remote from each other genetically compared to many European peoples between themselves. The closest genetic relatives for Finns are Estonians (FST to Helsinki 40 and to Kuusamo 90) and Swedes (FST to Helsinki 50 and to Kuusamo 100). The FST values given here are actual values multiplied by 10,000. The great intra-Finnish (FST) distance between Western Finns and Eastern Finns supports the theorized dual origin of the Finns based on the regional distribution of the two major Y-DNA haplogroups, N1c in Eastern Finland and I1a in Western Finland. According to more detailed estimations, the frequencies of N1c and I1a are 70.9% and 19.6% in northeastern Finland, but 41.3% and 41.3% in southwestern Finland, respectively.

A study on the Finnish genome found that Finns are not only more homogenous compared to other Europeans, but also that they are genetically distinct from their neighboring populations and form outliers in the genetic variation within Europe.

Autosomal genetic analyses have found that Finns, apart from their genome being mostly Northern European, also share up to 10% of their genes with Siberian populations. The specific Siberian-like ancestry is suggested to have arrived in Northern Europe during the early Iron Age, linked to the arrival of Uralic languages.

Theories of the origins of Finns

In the 19th century, the Finnish researcher Matthias Castrén prevailed with the theory that "the original home of Finns" was in west-central Siberia.

Until the 1970s, most linguists believed that Finns arrived in Finland as late as the first century AD. However, accumulating archaeological data suggests that the area of contemporary Finland had been inhabited continuously since the end of the ice age, contrary to the earlier idea that the area had experienced long uninhabited intervals. The hunter-gatherer Sami were pushed into the more remote northern regions.

A hugely controversial theory is so-called refugia. This was proposed in the 1990s by Kalevi Wiik, a professor emeritus of phonetics at the University of Turku. According to this theory, Finno-Ugric speakers spread north as the Ice age ended. They populated central and northern Europe, while Basque speakers populated western Europe. As agriculture spread from the southeast into Europe, the Indo-European languages spread among the hunter-gatherers. In this process, both the hunter-gatherers speaking Finno-Ugric and those speaking Basque learned how to cultivate land and became Indo-Europeanized. According to Wiik, this is how the Celtic, Germanic, Slavic, and Baltic languages were formed. The linguistic ancestors of modern Finns did not switch their language due to their isolated location. The main supporters of Wiik's theory are Professor Ago Künnap of the University of Tartu, Professor Kyösti Julku of the University of Oulu and Associate Professor Angela Marcantonio of the University of Rome. Wiik has not presented his theories in peer-reviewed scientific publications. Many scholars in Finno-Ugrian studies have strongly criticized the theory. Professor Raimo Anttila, Petri Kallio and brothers Ante and Aslak Aikio have rejected Wiik's theory with strong words, hinting strongly to pseudoscience, and even alt-right political biases among Wiik's supporters. Moreover, some dismissed the entire idea of refugia, due to the existence even today of arctic and subarctic peoples. The most heated debate took place in the Finnish journal Kaltio during autumn 2002. Since then, the debate has calmed, each side retaining their positions. Genotype analyses across the greater European genetic landscape have provided some credibility to the theory of the Last Glacial Maximum refugia. But this does not in any way corroborate or prove that these 'refugia' spoke Uralic/Finnic, as it belies wholly independent variables that are not necessarily coeval (i.e. language spreads and genetic expansions can occur independently, at different times and in different directions).

See also

 Demographics of Finland
 Finnic (disambiguation)
 Finnish (disambiguation)
 Finnish language
 Finnish Americans
 Finnish Brazilians
 Finnish Canadians
 Finnish Australians
 Finnish immigration to North America
 List of Finns

Explanatory notes

References

External links

Finnish Colony of Penedo, Brazil
FTDNA Finland Geographic DNA Project
The Finnish Heritage Museum of Fairport Harbor, Ohio
Folktinget
Finno-Ugric media center 

Ethnic groups in Finland
Ethnic groups in Sápmi
Baltic Finns